Bjarne Undheim (12 January 1905  –  28 May 1988) was a Norwegian educator and politician for the Centre Party.

He was born in Time. He obtained a cand.real. degree from the University of Oslo in 1930 and worked as a teacher and later principal at high schools in Rogaland.

He was elected to the Norwegian Parliament from Rogaland in 1961 and was re-elected once.

Undheim was mayor of Time during the term 1955–1959.

References

1905 births
1988 deaths
People from Time, Norway
Centre Party (Norway) politicians
Members of the Storting
Mayors of places in Rogaland
Heads of schools in Norway
20th-century Norwegian politicians